Albert Rust (born 10 October 1953) is a former French footballer, who last worked as goalkeeper coach for AS Saint-Étienne.

Albert Rust
Albert Rust is a football player and French coach, born on 10 October 1953 at Mulhouse. He became a goalkeeper, holding the position between the years 1970 and 1990.
He spent most of his career at Sochaux Football Club, he is the most capped player in history of the club, with 455 games played. He then played for Montpellier HSC with whom he won the Coupe de France in 1990.
For the National team, he  won the 1984 Olympic games with the French Olympic team. He was called up to the France National team numerous times, with whom he won the European Championship in 1984 and finished third in the World Cup in 1986.

Becoming a coach, he especially guided the Chamois niortais FC and the Stade brestois.

Biography

Player

Formed in the local club in Wittelsheim, Rust evolved as a defender in his early years before opting for the goalkeeper position. At age 19, he rejoined the FC Sochaux, a club known for its training center, and relatively quick accomplishment of its first team, they demonstrated an unspectacular but safe and steady style. He quickly took the top of the title over the goalkeeper Eugène Battmann and became the title holder during the 1975-1976 season. His good performances gave him the honor of being called upon by Henri Guérin of the team France A' 27 March 1976 against Luxembourg.

The following season, he knew there would be tough competition with another promising goalkeeper, Joël Bats coming up. The coach René Hauss opted for an original solution and alternated his goalkeepers every game to release a hierarchy. The situation unraveled with the departure of Bats to Auxerre in 1979. Later, Rust and Bats both agree that this was the most painful time in their professional careers.

Rust had his best years at the club with "The Golden Generation" of Sochaux F.C. in 1979-1983.
With Bernard Genghini, Yannick Stopyra, Philippe Anziani and Abdel Djaadaoui, The
team  played good attacking football and  focused on making a memorable journey in the UEFA Cup of 1980-1981. They reached the semi-finals after a particularly epic win in the third round against Eintracht Frankfurt in which they came up from a deficit of 2-0 to win 4-2 on aggregate, in the snow, thanks to Patrick Revelli. The same year these players also played the final of the Coupe des Alpes and lost to FC Basel in the Final.

Rusts club's good form could not be matched at the National level by the France National team. The national team Lacked the skill that the team possessed in 1982 . Taking advantage of the Olympic football tournament rule change which opened the tournament up to five professionals of any age per team, Rust joined the French Olympic team for qualification to the 1984 Games in Los Angeles, alongside François Brisson, Daniel Xuereb, and other Dominique Bijotat. The adventure ended with them winning and being awarded the gold medal on the top step of the podium at the Rose Bowl in Pasadena, after an indisputable victory in the final against Brazil (2-0).

After demonstrating good form during the Olympic qualifications, Rust was named in the list of 20 for the Euro 1984 just before the Olympic Games. He was the replacement of Joël Bats, and leader of the campaign of les Bleus for their first big title. Rust then won national number 2 behind his old rival club and was, naturally, selected for the 1986 World Cup in Mexico. In 1987, he left his club in pursuit of a new challenge, signing with newly promoted Montpellier.
He then won la Coupe de France with this club. He finally hung up his cleats at 38 years after a "freelance" year in Monaco. He played over 500 first division matches.

International career
He won one international cap for the France national team during the 1980s. After having won the gold medal at the 1984 Summer Olympics in Los Angeles, California and Euro 84, he was a member of the French team in the 1986 FIFA World Cup, where he played his sole international match against Belgium on 28 June.

Coaching career
After his playing career, he became a coach with several Ligue 2 and Championnat National sides. On 14 June 2010 the former US Créteil and Stade Brest head coach signed for AS Saint-Etienne as goalkeeper coach. Rust immediately moved on to a coaching career with several league 2 teams, after that he  coached Internationally as the Assistant Coach to Henry Michel (Saudi Arabia, Tunisia). He then went back to coaching in the National League (League 2) with the Stade Brest for three seasons. He led the National Club in D2.
In May 2006, he took over coaching for the team Créteil in League 2 but was dismissed by the Club on 18 September following a poor start to the 2006-07 season and was replaced by Artur Jorge.
Albert Rust, graduate of DEPF, was selected by Roland Romeyer to fill the Assistant Coach position of l'AS Saint-Étienne as the Keeper trainer in the 2010-11 season. For non-sport related reasons, Albert Rust was dismissed of his duties as a goalie trainer following his 2-year contract extension with the Club.

Career as a coach
 1991-1993 : Le Crès
 1993-1994 : AS Beauvais (assistant coach)
 1994-1995 : Al-Nasr (assistant coach of Henri Michel)
 1995-1999 : Chamois Niortais FC
 2000-2001 : Clermont Foot
 2001-2002 : Tunisia (assistant coach of Henri Michel)
 2002 : Stade Tunisien (Tunisia)
 2002-2003 : FC Sète
 2003-2006 : Stade Brestois
 2006-2007 : US Créteil

Honours
UEFA European Championship: 1984

References

External links
 
 
 French Football Federation Profile 

1953 births
Living people
French footballers
France international footballers
French football managers
Association football goalkeepers
1986 FIFA World Cup players
Olympic footballers of France
Olympic gold medalists for France
Footballers at the 1984 Summer Olympics
FC Sochaux-Montbéliard players
Montpellier HSC players
AS Monaco FC players
Ligue 1 players
UEFA Euro 1984 players
UEFA European Championship-winning players
Chamois Niortais F.C. managers
Clermont Foot managers
FC Sète 34 managers
Stade Brestois 29 managers
US Créteil-Lusitanos managers
Footballers from Mulhouse
Olympic medalists in football
Medalists at the 1984 Summer Olympics